Arias Deukmedjian (born 25 November 2004) is an American racing driver of Korean and Armenian descent. A podium finisher in the Formula 4 United States Championship, he currently competes in the Italian F4 Championship and the ADAC F4 Championship with Van Amersfoort Racing. He has previously competed in the Formula Regional European Championship with FA Racing by MP.

Career

Lower formulae 
Deukmedjian made his car racing debut in 2018, driving in two rounds of the F2000 Championship Series. He ended up with a best finish of eighth at Virginia International Raceway.

For the 2021 season, the American would make his full transition into single-seaters, teaming up with Crosslink/Kiwi Motorsport for the F4 United States Championship. He began his season in strong style, taking two podiums at the season opener at Road Atlanta, where he fought for the win in a rain-affected Race 2. However, following just two further rounds, Deukmedjian exited the series.

Indy Pro 2000 
The American took part in the Chris Griffis Memorial Test in 2021, driving an Indy Pro 2000 car run by Deuk Spine Racing.

FIA Formula 3 
In September 2022, Deukmedjian took part in the FIA Formula 3 post-season test at Jerez, driving for Carlin on all three days.

Racing record

Racing career summary 

† As Deukmedjian was a guest driver, he was ineligible to score points.
* Season still in progress.

Complete Formula Regional European Championship results 
(key) (Races in bold indicate pole position) (Races in italics indicate fastest lap)

† As Deukmedjian was a guest driver, he was ineligible to score points.
* Season still in progress.

Complete Italian F4 Championship results 
(key) (Races in bold indicate pole position) (Races in italics indicate fastest lap)

References

External links 
 
 

Living people
2004 births
American racing drivers
Formula Regional Americas Championship drivers
Formula Regional European Championship drivers
American people of Armenian descent
American people of Korean descent
MP Motorsport drivers
Italian F4 Championship drivers
ADAC Formula 4 drivers
Van Amersfoort Racing drivers
FA Racing drivers
Karting World Championship drivers
United States F4 Championship drivers